Samson Idiata (born 23 January 1988 in Ewu) is a Nigerian high jumper and long jumper.

He took the bronze medal at the 2003 All-Africa Games, and later finished fifth at the 2006 African Championships and tenth at the 2007 All-Africa Games. He later switched to long jump. In this event he has finished eighth at the 2010 African Championships.

His personal best was 2.15 metres, first achieved in October 2003 in Hyderabad and later equalled once. In long jump his personal best is 8.00 metres, achieved in May 2013 in Castellón.

He was the gold medallist in the long jump at the 2015 African Games, but was stripped of this title after failing a drug test for clenbuterol. He was banned for four years, until 15 September 2019.

Competition record

References

1988 births
Living people
Sportspeople from Edo State
Nigerian male high jumpers
Nigerian male long jumpers
Commonwealth Games competitors for Nigeria
Athletes (track and field) at the 2014 Commonwealth Games
Athletes (track and field) at the 2015 African Games
Nigerian sportspeople in doping cases
Doping cases in athletics
African Games bronze medalists for Nigeria
African Games medalists in athletics (track and field)
20th-century Nigerian people
21st-century Nigerian people